Battle of Sandwich may refer to the following naval battles:

Battle of Sandwich (851), between the West Saxons led by Æthelstan and the Danish Vikings
Battle of Sandwich (1217), also called the Battle of Dover, part of the First Barons' War
Battle of Sandwich (1460), during the Wars of the Roses